
Gmina Wizna is a rural gmina (administrative district) in Łomża County, Podlaskie Voivodeship, in north-eastern Poland.

The gmina contains part of the protected area called Łomża Landscape Park.

Villages
Gmina Wizna contains the villages and settlements of Boguszki, Bronowo, Janczewo, Jarnuty, Kokoszki, Kramkowo, Lisno, Małachowo, Męczki, Mrówki, Nart, Nieławice, Niwkowo, Nowe Bożejewo, Podkosacze, Ruś, Rusiniec, Rutki, Rutkowskie, Sambory, Sieburczyn, Srebrowo, Stare Bożejewo, Wierciszewo, Witkowo, Wizna, Włochówka and Zanklewo.

Neighbouring gminas
Gmina Wizna is bordered by the gminas of Jedwabne, Łomża, Piątnica, Rutki, Trzcianne and Zawady.

References

Polish official population figures 2006

External links 
 Wizna Web Page
 Urke Nachalnik Famous Polish gangster, turned noted author, who was born in Wizna

Wizna
Łomża County